Europaplein metro station (Dutch: Station Europaplein) is a station on the Route 52 (North–South Line) of the Amsterdam Metro in Amsterdam, Netherlands. It was opened on 22 July 2018.  Europaplein is an underground station situated in the Zuidas neighbourhood of Amsterdam-Zuid (Amsterdam South). The station is expected to handle around 20,000 passengers and arrivals per day.

History
The station, designed by Benthem Crouwel Architects, is situated beneath the Europaplein in the Zuidas neighbourhood in front of the main entrance of the Amsterdam RAI Exhibition and Convention Centre. The station has two side platforms of 130 meters long and approximately 4.5 meters wide at its narrowest point, which widens to 8 meters at each platform end where the entrances are located. The station was the only one on the Noord/Zuid line built using cut-and-cover methods. At 8 meters below sea level, the platforms can be accessed by fixed staircases (in addition to up-only escalators, as well as lifts).
The station has two entrances both in front of the convention centre, the northern entrance in front of the Europe Complex, and the southern entrance in front of the Holland Complex. The station is within walking distance of the Amsterdam RAI railway station which lies to the south.
The artwork at platform level is a photo collage by artist Gerald van der Kaap.  The collages span the length of the station and are featured on both platforms.  The municipal government selected his work by special committee in May 2013.

Gallery

References

External links
 GVB website 
 Foto's van Station Europaplein in de Beeldbank van het Stadsarchief Amsterdam 
 North-South Line project site 

Amsterdam Metro stations